Far-right subcultures refers to the symbolism, ideology and traits that hold relevance to various politically extreme right-wing groups and organisations. There are three kinds of subcultures within far-right movements to distinguish: subcultural parasitism, subcultural creation around ideology and subcultures that are networking with far-right movements, as some football hooligans did with neo-nazis.

Subcultures created around or related to Nazi ideology

Subcultural parasitism 

Far-right ideologists try to infiltrate subcultures in order to spread their ideas among them. These attempts are defined as subcultural parasitism. The most well-known subculture that has been taken over by the far-right and neo-nazis is the Skinhead scene, which originally started in Great Britain. Some examples for subculture parasitism: the Nipster, infiltration of the Hipster (contemporary subculture) by neo-nazis (Nazi Hipster), Nazi punk, infiltration of the Heavy metal subculture, known as National Socialist black metal (NSBM/NSCH). Subcultures as the Goth subculture and the Hip Hop subculture have also been infiltrated by far-right movements and ideologists. Some other examples for far-right or neo-Nazi subcultures: Esoteric Nazism and Nazi Satanism.

Cultural counter-subversion 
There is another strategy which is resorted to by neo-nazis and far right movements, and it is called cultural subversion. This strategy uses already existing forms of expression and organization and gives them a far right meaning. Some examples: 
Music: use of already existing songs and the change of its lyrics into something national or racist 
Slogans: the change of the left-wing slogan 'Long live the international solidarity' into 'Long live the national solidarity'
Forms of Organization: democratic forms of organizations are copied and accommodated with far right ideology

Modern forms of far-right subcultures and lifestyles in specific countries

Italy 
During its rule of Italy the National Fascist Party heavily influenced fashion in its pursuit of autarky and this pursuit was exemplified by its belief in the importance of aesthetics and symbolism: clothes had to be produced in Italy and they also had to reflect the values of the Italian people. Pieces of clothing such as the black shirts became associated with the dreaded Volunteer Militia for the Safety of the Nation and even to the regime itself. 
Nowadays neo-fascists still care a great deal about clothing, but with different approaches. Symbols and clothes like the Celtic Cross and the black clothing are still present and associated to the new filo-fascists political parties and movements, but, similarly to the neo-nazism case, there has also been a growing interest in "trendiness" and fashion, with new clothing brands that offer casual and formal clothing more in line with today's consumerist culture. This has led to three different types of brands usage by the neo-fascist subculture that still cares a big deal about clothing as a way to show their political affiliation, while caring about what is trendy as well:
 The use of brands that are not openly using symbols of fascism but that are thought to be targeting neo-fascist consumers in light of their choices in advertising and partnerships, with the choice of testimonials, models, settings and even copy material that recalls the neo-fascist archetypical man. For example, Pivert.
 The use of brands that while denying any political involvement (the apology of fascism in Italy is a felony officially) heavily rely on the fascist's regime icons, using symbols, mottos and images without using the name of the party while still making clear what is their political affiliation. An example is the decimaofficialstore.
 The use of brands that are arbitrarily given a power of identification with their political values by the members of the subculture itself.

The arbitrary appropriation of modern devices of today's consumer culture in addition to the ones typical of its "ancestor" in Neo-fascism is not just limited to fashion, examples of modern culture products that were not born with this political affiliation but were used by neo-fascists to frame their values and the adherence of its affiliates to them are Tolkien's novels, which led to the "Campi Hobbit" (Hobbit Camps) experience: real political camps where space was given to topics often overlooked by typical political institutions, with right wing music groups, visual artists, radio podcasts performances and social issues discussions about topics such as young people's unemployment together with paramilitary activities being carried out. Another very famous example is the politicization of football, with the Ultras groups often affiliated with certain ideologies. The majority of ultras groups in fact present small "bands" within them that are openly neo-fascist or at least far-right extremists, with groups such as Hellas Verona's "Brigate Gialloblu" or Juventus' "Vikings" having an infamous record of violence episodes, which are not related to the sport nor their supported teams' ideals.

Germany

Far right organisations in Germany 
Far right parties: East-Germany: National Democratic Party of Germany (NPD); West-Germany: 'Die Rechte' and 'Dritter Weg'. All together there are around 6000 members of far right parties in Germany.
Extreme right-wing comradeships: Blood & Honour network (or 'White Power'). Both networks are primarily selling extreme right-wing music and organizing international concerts. Their offers play an important role regarding the far right Lifestyle and they have an integrating effect on the far right scene in general. The Autonome Nationalisten are a similar organization, for predominantly young far right. The ideology is the same but in terms of aesthetics, they are more orientated towards their political opponent on the left and copy their lifestyles and symbols for their own purposes. See also Cultural Subversion
Intellectuals of the 'Neue Rechte' (New Right): they function as the source of inspiration and keyword transmitter. 
Far-right projects: An innovation of the last years are far right projects at the interface of virtual and real life. Examples are the 'Identitären' (Identitarian movement) and the 'Unsterblichen'. The 'Unsterblichen' was started by far rights in east Germany. They formulated the prosecution of the supposed 'Volkstods' (death of the nation). Which can be seen as relation to the demographic change in Germany and the  fear of being swamped by foreign influences. The 'Unsterblichen' took over the flashmob idea and produced high quality choreographies for demonstrations which they filmed professionally and distributed them with music in social networks.

Identitarian movement 

The Identitarian movement is one of the most renowned far-right youth cultures in Germany and it is also a part of the New Right. Within the New Right, it has four unique position features: youthfulness,  an excessive desire for action, pop culture and Corporate Identity.  The German Identitarian movement uses Facebook as its main platform, where it spreads quotations of famous thinkers of the Conservative Revolutionary movement such as Ernst Jünger and Carl Schmitt, articles of the far-right journal Sezession and videos of various campaigns.

United States

The American alt-right movement

Also referred to as the alternative right, the alt-right is a recently-formed political movement which holds extreme views on a wide array of political, cultural, racial and religious issues, with their central themes being white supremacy and white nationalism. It has gained significant prominence since the run-up to the Presidential election of 2016, in which Donald Trump was elected. The typical alt-right supporter is a white non-naturalized US citizen, most likely a person whose family lineage is without recent immigration to the US. While there are numerous recorded cases of anti-Semitic and anti-Muslim behavior by alt-right supporters, most of whom have a predominantly Christian background, personal religious disposition does not prove to be of great importance beyond the religious beliefs of those who are discriminated against.

Adoption of Neo-Fascist/Nazi symbolism 

Since Donald Trump's victory in November 2016, the exposure and symbolism which is associated with the alt-right has become more distinct. In mid-November 2016, an alt-right conference with approximately 200 people was held in Washington, D.C. One of the speakers at this event was president of the National Policy Institute and white supremacist; Richard Spencer. Audience members cheered and gave the Nazi salute when he said, "Hail Trump, hail our people, hail victory!" The parallel theme of cultural purity combined with the totalitarian and ominous connotations which are associated with Nazi history provide an aesthetic appeal to the themes and ideas of the alt-right. Due to the highly superficial nature of the group, the understanding of the key concepts which are behind these other far-right political movements is secondary to the imagery and the visual culture which are both associated with them.

Far-right subcultures and fashion labels

Fashion label abuse 

Fashion label abuse means in this case, far-right movements, use specific labels and connect their ideology. Some prominent examples are Lonsdale, Fred Perry and New Balance. The British sport label Lonsdale became popular in the German neo-nazi movement because of the letters 'NSDA' in the name, which refers to the National Socialist German Workers' Party (NSDAP, Nazi Party), that was active between 1920 and 1945. The popularity of Fred Perry can be explained through the demand in the skinhead scene. On top of that the brand offers polo shirts with a collar in the colors black-white-red, which was the flag color used by the nazi regime and is therefore as well prominent in German neo-nazi movements. Both brands distance themselves from any association. In November 2016 Matthew LeBretton, New Balance's vice president of public affairs, criticized the Trans-Pacific Partnership trade agreement, that the Obama administration led and Donald Trump opposes. After New Balance defended its opposition to TTP, Andrew Anglin, publisher of the American neo-nazi news and commentary website The Daily Stormer, declared New Balance the “Official Shoes of White People”.

Fashion label creation around far-right ideology 

There are also fashion labels that were created for neo-nazis, by neo-nazis.
Some examples for nazi fashion labels: Ansgar Aryan, Consdaple, Eric and Sons, Masterrace Europe, Outlaw, Reconquista, Rizist, Thor Steinar, Troublemaker, Dryve by Suizhyde, Greifvogel Wear, Hate-Hate, Hermannsland, Sport Frei, Pro Violence.

See also

Far-right politics 
Far-right social centres
Fascism
Fashwave
Ku Klux Klan
List of fascist movements
List of fascist movements by country
List of Ku Klux Klan organizations
List of neo-Nazi bands 
List of neo-Nazi organizations
List of organizations designated by the Southern Poverty Law Center as hate groups
List of white nationalist organizations
National Socialist black metal
Nazism
Neo-Confederates
Neo-fascism
Neo-Nazism 
Neo-völkisch movements
Nipster 
Radical right (Europe)
Radical right (United States)
Religious terrorism
Right-wing terrorism
Skinhead 
White nationalism
White power music 
White power skinhead 
White supremacy
Youth subculture

References
Notes

Bibliography
Borstel, Dierk; Bozay, Kemal ed. (2017). Ungleichwertigkeitsideologien in der Einwanderungsgesellschaft. Wiesbaden: Springer Fachmedien.
Bruns, Julian, Kathrin Glösel, and Natascha Strobl. Die Identitären: Handbuch zur Jugendbewegung der Neuen Rechten in Europa. Unrast, 2014.
Goffman, Erving. Frame analysis: An essay on the organization of experience. Harvard University Press, 1974.
Häusler, Alexander; Schedler, Jan. "Neue Formen einer flüchtlingsfeindlichen sozialen Bewegung von rechts" Neue Formen einer flüchtlingsfeindlichen sozialen Bewegung von rechts 
Jaschke, Hans-Gerd. "Right-Wing Extremism and Populism in Contemporary Germany and Western Europe." Rightwing radicalism today: Perspectives from Europe and the US (2013): 22–36.
Leo, Tobias. "Der Nazis neue Kleider: Die Vereinnahmung jugendlicher Subkulturen durch die extreme Rechte." historia. scribere 8 (2016): 83-124 Der Nazis neue Kleider: Die Vereinnahmung jugendlicher Subkulturen durch die extreme Rechte
Mecklenburg, Jens, ed. Handbuch deutscher Rechtsextremismus. Elefanten Press, 1996.
Patyi, Peter, and Jana Levická. "Attractiveness of right wing oriented movements and subcultures in modern society of the Slovak republic." Procedia - Social and Behavioral Sciences 143 (2014): 832–837.
Pisoiu, Daniela. "Subcultures, violent radicalization and terrorism." (2015): 1–2. 
Schedler, Jan. "Die extreme Rechte als soziale Bewegung." Handbuch Rechtsextremismus. Springer Fachmedien Wiesbaden, 2016. 285–323. 
Schlembach, Raphael. "New trends on the German extreme right." (2013): 192–194. 
Stroud, Joseph James Iain. "Constructions of identity through music in extreme-right subcultures." (2014).

Far-right politics
Political movements
White supremacy
Subcultures
Political culture
Fascism
Neo-fascism
Neo-Nazism